Northlakes is an unincorporated community and census-designated place (CDP) in Caldwell County, North Carolina, United States. The population was 1,534 at the 2010 census. It is part of the Hickory–Lenoir–Morganton Metropolitan Statistical Area.

Geography
It is bordered on the southeast by Lake Hickory, a reservoir on the Catawba River. The river forms the Caldwell County line, with Burke and Catawba counties on the opposite side. The city of Hickory is on the opposite side of the leg and also borders Northlakes to the west. A portion of the town of Granite Falls borders Northlakes to the northwest. The northern edge of the community is Gunpowder Creek, inundated to form an arm of Lake Hickory.

Demographics

2020 census

As of the 2020 United States census, there were 1,543 people, 617 households, and 400 families residing in the CDP.

2000 census
As of the census of 2000, there were 1,390 people, 511 households, and 429 families residing in the CDP. The population density was 932.2 people per square mile (360.2/km2). There were 535 housing units at an average density of 358.8 per square mile (138.6/km2). The racial makeup of the CDP was 98.27% White, 0.50% African American, 0.22% Native American, 0.22% Asian, 0.22% from other races, and 0.58% from two or more races. Hispanic or Latino of any race were 0.50% of the population.

There were 511 households, out of which 38.9% had children under the age of 18 living with them, 76.1% were married couples living together, 6.3% had a female householder with no husband present, and 15.9% were non-families. 13.3% of all households were made up of individuals, and 4.7% had someone living alone who was 65 years of age or older. The average household size was 2.72 and the average family size was 2.99.

In the CDP, the population was spread out, with 27.3% under the age of 18, 3.6% from 18 to 24, 30.1% from 25 to 44, 29.8% from 45 to 64, and 9.2% who were 65 years of age or older. The median age was 39 years. For every 100 females, there were 98.0 males. For every 100 females age 18 and over, there were 97.8 males.

The median income for a household in the CDP was $67,692, and the median income for a family was $67,237. Males had a median income of $56,429 versus $33,000 for females. The per capita income for the CDP was $27,285. About 1.4% of families and 2.4% of the population were below the poverty line, including 4.7% of those under age 18 and none of those age 65 or over.

References

External links
Northlakes Home Owners Association

Census-designated places in Caldwell County, North Carolina
Census-designated places in North Carolina